Darlene Magnolia Ricasa Antonino-Custodio (born December 26, 1973) is a politician from the province of South Cotabato, Philippines. She previously served as the representative of the first district of South Cotabato and mayor of General Santos. She gained national fame for defeating her challenger, professional boxer seven-division world champion Manny Pacquiao in the 2007 elections.

Darlene comes from New Manila, Quezon City. Her father and mother, Aldelbert and Luwalhati R. Antonino both served as mayor and house representative of General Santos and South Cotabato. She is also the grandgrandaugher of Senators Gaudencio and Magnolia Antonino. She is married to Benjamin Custodio, a businessman.

Early life and education 

Darlene was born on December 26, 1973, in California, United States. She graduated high school at O.B Montessori, Manila in 1992. She finished her college degree in B.S. Business Management in De La Salle University-Manila in 1996. She holds a master's degree in Culinary Arts in the prestigious school Le Cordon Bleu in London, England.

Career 
She belongs to the NPC-AIM party and served as the House Deputy Minority Leader in the 13th Congress of the Philippines.

On May 14, 2007, elections, she defeated her challenger professional boxer seven-division world champion Manny Pacquiao, by more than thirty thousand votes.

On May 10, 2010, she ran for the mayorship of General Santos and won.

On May 14, 2013, she was defeated by Councilor Ronnel Rivera in her bid for a second term as Mayor of General Santos in the 2013 Philippine mid-term elections.

Credits 
TV Appearances
2007 Proudly Filipina
2007 Upclose and Personal
2008 Totoo TV

References

Rep. Darlene Antonino-Custodio: Darling of the House opposition.(Metro & National News)

External links
 Darlene's  I-site.ph
 Official Website of Darlene Magnolia R. Antonino-Custodio
 Official Website of the City of General Santos

1973 births
Living people
People from General Santos
Members of the House of Representatives of the Philippines from South Cotabato
Women members of the House of Representatives of the Philippines
Women mayors of places in the Philippines
Mayors of places in South Cotabato
Alumni of Le Cordon Bleu
21st-century Filipino women politicians
21st-century Filipino politicians
De La Salle University alumni